Kisly Klyuch is a rural locality (a selo) in Gonzhinskoye Rural Settlement of Magdagachinsky District, Amur Oblast, Russia. The population was 24 as of 2018.

Geography 
Kisly Klyuch is located on northwest on the Amur–Zeya Plain, 46 km northwest of Magdagachi (the district's administrative centre) by road. Gonzha is the nearest rural locality.

References 

Rural localities in Magdagachinsky District